U.S. Customhouse and Post Office may refer to:

U.S. Post Office and Customs House-Douglas Main, Douglas, Arizona
Old Post Office Building and Customhouse (Little Rock, Arkansas)
U.S. Post Office, Courthouse, and Customhouse (Wilmington, Delaware)
Old Post Office and Customshouse (Key West, Florida)
U.S. Customs House and Post Office (Pensacola, Florida)
U.S. Post Office and Courthouse (Atlanta, Georgia)
U.S. Post Office, Customhouse, and Courthouse (Honolulu, Hawaii)
United States Post Office, Court House and Custom House (Louisville, Kentucky)
Old U.S. Customshouse and Post Office and Fireproof Storage Company Warehouse, W. Liberty Street, Louisville, Kentucky
U.S. Customhouse and Post Office (Bath, Maine)
Machias Post Office and Customhouse, Machias, Maine
U.S. Customhouse and Post Office (Waldoboro, Maine), listed on the National Register of Historic Places in Maine
U.S. Customhouse (Old Customhouse) and Post Office, Wiscasset, Maine
United States Post Office and Custom House (St. Paul, Minnesota)
U.S. Post Office, Courthouse, and Customhouse (Biloxi, Mississippi)
U.S. Post Office and Customhouse (Gulfport, Mississippi)
U.S. Customhouse and Post Office (St. Louis, Missouri)
U.S. Customhouse and Post Office (Springfield, Missouri), listed on the National Register of Historic Places in Missouri
 The James T. Foley United States Courthouse in Albany, New York, listed on the National Register of Historic Places as United States Court House, Customs House and Post Office.
U.S. Customs House and Post Office – Pembina, North Dakota, listed on the National Register of Historic Places in North Dakota
U.S. Post Office (Astoria, Oregon), listed on the National Register of Historic Places as United States Post Office and Custom House
Bristol Customshouse and Post Office, Rhode Island
Customs House Museum and Cultural Center, Clarksville, Tennessee, former customs house and former post office
Galveston U.S. Post Office, Custom House and Courthouse, Texas
Laredo United States Post Office, Court House and Custom House, Texas
U.S. Post Office and Customhouse (Burlington, Vermont)
U.S. Courthouse, Post Office and Customs House (Newport, Vermont)
U.S. Post Office and Customhouse (Richmond, Virginia)
U.S. Post Office and Customshouse (Everett, Washington), listed on the National Register of Historic Places in Washington
U.S. Post Office, Courthouse, and Custom House (Spokane, Washington)
Customhouse and Post Office (Washington, D.C.)
U.S. Post Office & Customhouse (New Haven, CT)

See also
List of United States post offices
U.S. Customhouse (disambiguation)